The John Sloan Homestead is a historic house in Volin, South Dakota. It was built in 1881–1885 with chalk rock by John Sloan, who established the homestead in 1880. It has been listed on the National Register of Historic Places since April 16, 1980.

References

National Register of Historic Places in Yankton County, South Dakota
Houses completed in 1883